Dobu Island is an island, part of D'Entrecasteaux Islands in Papua New Guinea. It is located south of Fergusson Island and north of Normanby Island. It is currently administered by Dobu Rural LLG.

The people of Dobu were the subject of a seminal anthropological study by Reo Fortune.  He described the Dobuan character as "paranoid", obsessed with black magic, and as having extremely unusual attitudes toward sex and violence.

Fortune's account was reiterated by Ruth Benedict in her popular work Patterns of Culture.  However, many later anthropologists expressed skepticism.

Fortune's analysis was significantly challenged by Susanne Kuehling in her 2005 title Dobu:  Ethics of Exchange on a Massim Island, Papua New Guinea.  In particular, Kuehling's interest lies at the intersection of ethics and personal conduct.

References

Sources
 Benedict, Ruth (1934). Patterns of Culture. New York: Houghton Mifflin.
 Fortune, Reo (1932, repr. 1963). Sorcerers of Dobu: the social anthropology of the Dobu Islanders of the Western Pacific. London: Routledge and Kegan Paul.
 Kuehling, Susanne (2005). Dobu:  Ethics of Exchange on a Massim Island, Papua New Guinea.  Honolulu:  University of Hawaii Press.

External links

George Brown, Melanesians and Polynesians, their life-histories described and compared, Published 1910 by Macmillan and co. Ltd., London - Open Library

D'Entrecasteaux Islands
Islands of Milne Bay Province